Stabat Mater is a work by Gioachino Rossini based on the traditional structure of the Stabat Mater sequence for chorus and soloists. It was composed late in his career after retiring from the composition of opera. He began the work in 1831 but did not complete it until 1841.

Composition
In 1831 Rossini was traveling in Spain in the company of his friend the Spanish banker, Alexandre Aguado, owner of Château Margaux. In the course of the trip, Fernández Varela, a state councillor, commissioned a setting of the traditional liturgical text, the Stabat Mater. Rossini managed to complete part of the setting of the sequence in 1832, but ill health made it impossible for him to complete the commission. Having written only half the score (nos. 1 and 5–9), he asked his friend Giovanni Tadolini to compose six additional movements. Rossini presented the completed work to Varela as his own. It was premiered on Holy Saturday of 1833 in the Chapel of San Felipe el Real in Madrid, but this version was never again performed.

When Varela died, his heirs sold the work for 2,000 francs to a Parisian music publisher, Antoine Aulagnier, who printed it. Rossini protested, claiming that he had reserved publication rights for himself, and disowned Aulagnier's version, since it included the music by Tadolini. Although surprised by this, Aulangier went ahead and arranged for a public performance at the Salle Herz on October 31, 1841, at which only the six pieces by Rossini were performed. In fact, Rossini had already sold the publication rights for 6,000 francs to another Paris publisher, Eugène Troupenas. Lawsuits ensued, and Troupenas emerged the victor. Rossini finished the work, replacing the music by Tadolini, before the end of 1841. The brothers Léon and Marie Escudier, who had purchased the performing rights of Rossini's final version of the score from Troupenas for 8,000 francs, sold them to the director of the Théâtre-Italien for 20,000 francs, who began making preparations for its first performance.

Rossini's extensive operatic career had divided the public into admirers and critics. The announcement of the premiere of Rossini's Stabat Mater provided an occasion for a wide-ranging attack by Richard Wagner, who was in Paris at the time, not only on Rossini but more generally on the current European fashion for religious music and the money to be made from it. A week before the scheduled concert Robert Schumann's Neue Zeitschrift für Musik carried the pseudonymous essay, penned by Wagner under the name of "H. Valentino", in which he claimed to find Rossini's popularity incomprehensible: "It is extraordinary! So long as this man lives, he'll always be the mode." Wagner concluded his polemic with the following observation: "That dreadful word: Copyright—growls through the scarce laid breezes. Action! Action! Once more, Action! And money is fetched out, to pay the best of lawyers, to get documents produced, to enter caveats.—O ye foolish people, have ye lost your hiking for your gold? I know somebody who for five francs will make you five waltzes, each of them better than that misery of the wealthy master's!" At the time when Wagner wrote this, he was still in his late twenties and he had not yet had much success with the acceptance of his own music in the French capital.

Performance history
The Stabat Mater was performed complete for the first time in Paris at the Théâtre-Italien's Salle Ventadour on 7 January 1842, with Giulia Grisi (soprano), Emma Albertazzi (mezzo-soprano), Mario (tenor), and Antonio Tamburini (baritone) as the soloists. The Escudiers reported that:
Rossini's name was shouted out amid the applause. The entire work transported the audience; the triumph was complete. Three numbers had to be repeated...and the audience left the theater moved and seized by an admiration that quickly won all Paris.

In March Gaetano Donizetti led the Italian premiere in Bologna with great success. Donizetti reported the public's reaction:

The enthusiasm is impossible to describe. Even at the final rehearsal, which Rossini attended, in the middle of the day, he was accompanied to his home to the shouting of more than 500 persons. The same thing the first night, under his window, since he did not appear in the hall.

Despite the fact that the work is markedly different from his secular compositions, Northern German critics, as reported by Heinrich Heine in an essay on Rossini, criticised the work as "too worldly, sensuous, too playful for the religious subject." In response the French music historian Gustave Chouquet has remarked that "it must not be forgotten that religion in the South is a very different thing from what it is in the North."

Music
The Stabat Mater is scored for four vocal soloists (soprano, mezzo-soprano, tenor, and bass), mixed chorus, and an orchestra of 2 flutes, 2 oboes, 2 clarinets, 2 bassoons, 4 horns, 2 trumpets, 3 trombones, timpani, and strings.

Rossini divided the poem's twenty 3-line verses into ten movements and used various combinations of forces for each movement:

 Stabat Mater dolorosa (verse 1) – Chorus and all four soloists
 Cujus animam (verses 2–4) – Tenor
 Quis est homo (verses 5–6) – Soprano and mezzo-soprano
 Pro peccatis (verses 7–8) – Bass
 Eja, Mater (verses 9–10) – Bass recitative and chorus
 Sancta Mater (verses 11–15) – All four soloists
 Fac ut portem (verses 16–17) – Mezzo-soprano
 Inflammatus (verses 18–19) – Soprano and chorus
 Quando corpus morietur (verse 20) – Chorus and all four soloists
 In sempiterna saecula. Amen (not part of the standard text) – Chorus
Written in 1841 for tenor solo, the andantino maestoso section "Cuius animam", with its rollicking and memorable tune, is often performed apart from the work's other movements as a demonstration of the singer's bravura technique. The first theme in "Cujus animam" was also quoted note-for-note in the 1941 Woody Herman jazz number, "Blues on Parade".

Recordings
1954
 Ferenc Fricsay, conductor
 RIAS Symphony Orchestra, Berlin Women's Chorus, RIAS Chamber Choir, RIAS Boy's Choir
 Soloists: Maria Stader, Marianna Radev, Ernst Haefliger, Kim Borg
 Audite 95587 (mono, live recording from Berlin Konzertsaal der Hochschule, 22 September 1954)
1961
 Karl Forster, conductor
 Berliner Symphoniker, Chor der St. Hedwigs-Kathedrale Berlin
 Soloists: Pilar Lorengar, Betty Allen, Josef Traxel, Josef Greindl
 EMI
1971
 István Kertész, conductor
 London Symphony Orchestra and Chorus
 Pilar Lorengar, Yvonne Minton, Luciano Pavarotti, Hans Sotin
 Decca Ovation 417 766-2 (reissued from 1971)
1982
 Carlo Maria Giulini, conductor
 Philharmonia Orchestra and Chorus
 Soloists: Katia Ricciarelli, Lucia Valentini Terrani, Dalmacio Gonzalez, Ruggero Raimondi
 DG 477 6333
1982
 Riccardo Muti, conductor
 Maggio Musicale Fiorentino Orchestra
 Soloists: Catherine Malfitano, Agnes Baltsa, Robert Gambill, Gwynne Howell
 EMI Classics CDC7 47402-2
1988
 Claudio Scimone, conductor
 I Solisti Veneti, Ambrosian Singers
 Soloists: Cecilia Gasdia, Margarita Zimmermann, Chris Merritt, José Garcia
 Erato/RCA MCE75493
1990
 Richard Hickox, conductor
 City of London Sinfonia, London Symphony Chorus
 Soloists: Helen Field, Della Jones, Arthur Davies, Roderick Earle
 Chandos 8780
1990
 Semyon Bychkov, conductor
 Bavarian Radio Symphony Orchestra, Bavarian Radio Chorus
 Soloists: Carol Vaness, Cecilia Bartoli, Francisco Araiza, Ferruccio Furlanetto
 Phillips Digital Classics 426 312-2
1995
 Myung-Whun Chung, conductor
 Vienna Philharmonic, Vienna State Opera Concert Choir
 Soloists: Ľuba Orgonášová, Cecilia Bartoli, Raúl Giménez, Roberto Scandiuzzi
 DG 449 178-2GH
1999
 Pier Giorgio Morandi, conductor
 Hungarian State Opera Orchestra and Chorus
 Soloists: Patrizia Pace, Gloria Scalchi, Antonio Siragusa, Carlo Colombara
1999
 Marcus Creed, conductor
 Academy for Ancient Music Berlin, RIAS Chamber Choir
 Soloists: Krassimira Stoyanova, Petra Lang, Bruce Fowler, Daniel Borowski
 Harmonia Mundi HMC90 1693.Period instrument recording.
2001
 Christoph Spering, conductor
 Das neue Orchester, Chorus Musicus
 Iride Martinez, Sara Mingardo, Charles Castronovo, John Relyea
 OPUS 111 OP 30247
2003
 Riccardo Chailly, conductor
 Royal Concertgebouw Orchestra; Netherlands Radio Chorus
 Soloists: Barbara Frittoli, Sonia Ganassi, Giuseppe Sabbatini, Michele Pertusi
 Decca 460781-2
2010
 Antonio Pappano, conductor
 Orchestra dell'Accademia Santa Cecilia, orchestra and chorus
 Soloists: Anna Netrebko, Joyce DiDonato, Lawrence Brownlee, Ildebrando D'Arcangelo
 EMI Classics

References
Notes

Sources
 Gossett, Philip (1997) et al, The New Grove Masters of Italian Opera: Rossini, Donizetti, Bellini, Verdi, Puccini, W. W. Norton, Inc.
 Gossett, Philip (1983). "Gioachino Rossini" in The New Grove Masters of Italian Opera. New York: Norton. .
 Fuller Maitland, J. A., editor (1908). Grove's Dictionary of Music and Musicians (five volumes). London: Macmillan.

External links

Compositions by Gioachino Rossini
Rossini, Gioachino
1841 compositions
Collaborations in classical music